Glory Film Co. was established to produce the cinema film 'The Troop' which had a Royal Premiere at BAFTA in the presence of The Princess Royal. Shot in 35mm CinemaScope the film features The King's Troop, Royal Horse Artillery and has a narrative introduction by Oscar-winning actor John Mills (Ryan's Daughter).

The Troop film

The Troop was produced and directed by Marcus Dillistone. Associate producer was former Troop Captain Paul-Anthony Viollet, and the cinematographer was Oscar-nominee Alex Thomson BSC. The soundtrack was composed by Julian Scott (composer) and performed by The Royal Philharmonic Orchestra. The film was sponsored by Panavision, FujiFilm, and Technicolor. 
A request from Buckingham Palace led to a 35mm film copy of 'The Troop' being supplied to Her Majesty Queen Elizabeth II to view at Sandringham over Christmas 1999.

Cinema Projects
Following its involvement in The Troop, FujiFilm commissioned Glory Film Co. to make a series of films to demonstrate its new motion picture filmstocks. For these projects Glory employed leading cinematographers: Oscar-winners Jack Cardiff OBE, BSC, ASC, (The African Queen) and Ronnie Taylor BSC (Gandhi) together with Phedon Papamichael ASC (Walk the Line), John de Borman BSC (The Full Monty), Sue Gibson BSC (Spooks), Thierry Arbogast AFC (The Fifth Element), Ron Stanett CSC (Evel Knievel) and Tony Pierce-Roberts BSC (A Room With a View). The films were shot at Pinewood (LightsII) and Shepperton studios (Lights II, Return of The Shadow), with locations including Hastings in East Sussex (The Glow). 'Lights II' (2005) featured the last cinema performance of John Mills (at age 96). He played a tramp and was photographed by cinematographer Jack Cardiff, himself 90 years old.

Sir John Mills

Glory Film Co. subsequently produced a 'slate' of films including 'Sir John Mills' Moving Memories' a television co-production for BBC/Carlton. The film was shown as part of the BBC Christmas schedule.

Moving Memories uses Sir John's 16mm home movies to help tell the story of his life. The footage features an extensive list of actors, including: Walt Disney, David Niven, Tyrone Power, Ralph Richardson, Richard Attenborough, Douglas Fairbanks Jnr., Nanette Newman, Stewart Grainger, Tom Courtenay, Rex Harrison, Karl Malden, Vivien Leigh, Dirk Bogarde, Bryan Forbes, Ian McShane, Tony Hancock, Montgomery Clift, Anthony Quayle, Jean Simmons, Harry Andrews, Lionel Jefferies, Deborah Kerr, Bernard Lee, Joan Plowright, Ernest Borgnine, Angela Lansbury, Terry Thomas, Laurence Olivier, Mary, Juliet
and Hayley Mills.

BFI Tribute
John Mills, became close friends with director Marcus Dillistone who was invited to direct the British Film Industry's live tribute to Sir John in association with The Lord's Taverners and The Royal Navy. The show featured Dame Kiri te Kanawa, Roger Moore, Stephen Fry, Juliet & Hayley Mills, Lord Lloyd Webber and Lord Attenborough.

Olympic Ceremonies
Glory director Marcus Dillistone was Associate Producer Music for the Athens 2004 Summer Olympics opening ceremony and closing ceremony. Glory has operated around the world including the USA, Australia, Egypt, Jordan, Qatar, Sweden, Norway, Switzerland, Greece, Italy, France, Singapore and the Caribbean.

Charitable Projects
In addition to commercial and entertainment projects, Glory Film Co. contributes time and resources to realising charitable film projects such as 'Riding for The Disabled' (featuring the Princess Royal), 'Outreach', 'The Spinal Injury Patient Film' (that won an international Telly Award in 2012), and 'Mobility and Enablement'.

References

Film production companies of the United Kingdom
Mass media companies established in 1996